Electric Gardens, (Electric Gardens Festival), sometimes abbreviated to 'EGFestival', or 'EGFest', or sometimes simply 'EG', was a medium-sized 'Boutique' Music Festival situated at Mount Ephraim, Faversham in Kent. The event was held on a weekend in early August in 2006 and 2007.

Electric Gardens 2008 was cancelled due to unforeseen circumstances. In February 2008 a key player in organising the event was taken to hospital with a life-threatening illness. With no foreseeable date as to when he would be allowed home, let alone back to work, the organisers were forced to cancel.

The Myspace Bus
An inactive bus was parked at the festival grounds, provided by Myspace, in which the artists and bands were available to meet. Free gifts and information are also available from here.

Line ups by year

2006

Main Stage

Saturday
Southern Fried Records Stage
Audio Bullys
Armand Van Helden
Cassius (DJ set)
Cagedbaby
Grandadbob
Touché
Nathan Detroit

Sunday
The Charlatans
Morning Runner
The Automatic
The Young Knives
The Fratellis
The Boy Least Likely To
The Long Blondes

Unspecified Stages

Saturday
Archie Bronson Outfit
The Elegant Bachelors
Audio Bullys
Layo & Bushwacka!
Armand Van Helden
Stanton Warriors
Plump DJs
Caged Baby
Soho Dolls
Grant Dee
Mezza Breaks
Cassius
Veto Silver
Marcus Wallis
Touché
Warren Suicide
Nathan Detroit
Paul Arnold
Chew The Fat!
Grandadbob
Southern Fried

Sunday
The Charlatans
The Automatic
Morning Runner
The Fratellis
The Long Blondes
The Earlies
The Boy Least Likely To
Brakes
Battle
Jamie T
Adem
Field Music
Findlay Brown
Duels
The Electric Soft Parade
The Veils
Mohair
Larrikin Love
The Young Knives
Kid Harpoon
Eyoe

2007

Main Stage

Saturday
Supergrass
Calvin Harris
The Pipettes
Kate Nash
Pull Tiger Tail
Blood Red Shoes
Jonny Flynn
Reverend and the Makers
Palladium

Sunday
Happy Mondays
The Rakes
The Young Knives
The Maccabees
Noisettes
Hot Club de Paris
Milburn (band)
Sonic Heatrs

Second stage

Saturday
Plan B (rapper)
New Young Pony Club
The Holloways
Lethal Bizzle
Foals
Peggy sue and the pirates
Video Nasties
Newton Faulkner
Ciara Haidar

Sunday
Patrick Wolf
Jack Peñate
Mr Hudson & The Library
Kid Harpoon
The Teenagers
Late of the Pier
Laura Marling
Ox.Eagle.Lion.Man
The Sylvias

Myspace Stage

Saturday
Good Books
Lupen Crook
Beans on Toast
Nic Dawson Kelly
Gillan Edgar
Tom Allalone and the Great Expectations
Thom Stone
Poetry by Dockers MC
Scroobius Pip
The Thirst
Stuart James
Eleanor Goulding
 
Sunday
Underground Heros
Devils Gun
Sparrows
Chineapples
Rosemary
Maker
The Long Weekend
Our Name is Legion
Letters from London
The Cut Outs

Club Class Dance Stage

Saturday
Slam (band)
Stanton Warriors
Nic Fanciulli
Meat Katie
Mike Pickering
A Skillz
Mark Fanciulli & Small Fry
Shake DJs
Mezza Breaks

Sunday
Danny Howells
Funk D'Void
Justin Robertson
Damian Lazarus
Desyn Masiello
Micky Slim
Sam Ball & Anil Chawla
Pete Griffiths & George Andrews
Warning: 2 Dirty DJs
Rebel Beat Allies

References

External links
eFestivals festival coverage
Virtual Festivals festival summary
Virtual Festivals festival photos
Mount Ephraim Gardens (Festival site) Official website

Music festivals in Kent